Cangshan may refer to the following locations in China:

Cangshan County (苍山县), Shandong
Cangshan District (仓山区), Fuzhou, Fujian
Cangshan, Cangshan District (仓山镇), town in said district
Cang Mountain (苍山), mountain range in Dali Prefecture, Yunnan
Cangshan, Sichuan (仓山镇), town in Zhongjiang County